This is a list of company towns.

See the category Company towns for an unannotated list of articles.
See the category Socialist planned cities for an unannotated list of articles.

Europe

Belgium 

 Louvain-la-Neuve, home of the Université Catholique de Louvain

Czech Republic 
 Zlín, original headquarters of Bata Shoes company
 Zruč nad Sázavou, Central Bohemia region (Bata came in 1939)
 Sezimovo Ústí

Denmark 

 Billund, home of LEGO's International Headquarters.
 Bjerringbro, home of Grundfos' International headquarters.
 Nordborg, home of Danfoss' International headquarters.
 Struer, home of Bang & Olufsen' International headquarters.

France 

 Cité ouvrière at Mulhouse
 Noisiel (Seine-et-Marne), home of the chocolate factory owned by the Menier Family
 Sochaux-Montbéliard (Doubs), home of Peugeot
 Villeneuvette (Hérault), mill town owned by Jules Maistre
 Le Creusot (Saône-et-Loire), forge town developed by Eugène and Adolphe Schneider.
 Hayange and Jœuf, blast furnaces towns, fiefdoms of De Wendel family.
 Thumeries (Nord), home of the sugar factory previously owned by the Béghin Family

Germany 

 Leverkusen, home of the Bayer AG
 Wolfsburg, built to house Volkswagen workers
 Sindelfingen, home of Mercedes-Benz's largest production plant, the Mercedes-Benz Museum, Mercedes-Benz Advanced Design Studio, and its Customer Center. Sindelfingen is a suburb of Stuttgart, headquarters of Mercedes-Benz.

Former GDR
 Eisenhüttenstadt 
 Schwedt
 Halle-Neustadt
 Wolfen-Nord, now in Bitterfeld-Wolfen
 Hoyerswerda

Hungary
Dunaújváros
Tiszaújváros
Petőfibánya

Ireland 

 Rochfortbridge (County Westmeath), built by public company OPW in the 1840s as part of famine relief on the site of an original village and rebuilt 110 years later by Bord na Móna during the 1950s for its employees, the more modern phase being designed by architect Frank Gibney.

Italy 

 San Donato Milanese, home of the ENI. Built by Enrico Mattei for company's workers, the town is centered on a neighborhood called "Metanopoli" (Methanopolis).
 Rosignano Solvay. Built by Solvay for company's workers of the factory located in the neighbourhood of the city.
 Colleferro. Built in the 1912 by Bombrini-Parodi-Delfino for company's workers of the factory located in the neighbourhood of the city.

Moldova 

 Dnestrovsc, developed by Moldavskaya GRES

Netherlands 

 Batadorp, Best municipality, developed by Bata Shoes
 Heveadorp, Renkum municipality, developed by rubber manufacturing company Hevea 
 Philipsdorp, Eindhoven municipality, developed by Philips. Philips employed about 40.000 people in Eindhoven in the mid sixties. 
 Radio Kootwijk, Apeldoorn municipality, developed by Dutch P.T.T.

Norway 
 Barentsburg, mining town run by Arktikugol
 Grumant, ghost mining town run by Arktikugol
 Longyearbyen, former mining company town run by Store Norske Spitsbergen Kulkompani
 Ny-Ålesund, former mining, now research town run by Kings Bay
 Pyramiden, ghost mining town run by Arktikugol
 Sveagruva, mining town run by Store Norske
 Rjukan, former Norsk Hydro company town

Poland 
 Nowa Huta in Kraków
 Giszowiec and Nikiszowiec in Katowice
 Stalowa Wola and Nowa Dęba in the Central Industrial Region (Poland)
 Kawęczyn (historically, until 1944), now part of Warsaw

Ukraine 
 Sievierodonetsk
 Pripyat

Russia

Iron and Steel industry:
Magnitogorsk

Non-ferrous metal industry (the plants there are mostly owned by Norilsk Nickel):
Norilsk
Monchegorsk
Zapolyarny
Nikel

Iron mining:
Kovdor
Olenegorsk

Non-metal mineral extraction and processing:
Apatity
Kirovsk

Oil and gas:
Surgut
Nizhnevartovsk
Nefteyugansk
Novy Urengoy

Petrochemical industry:
Kstovo
Kirishi

Textile industry
Ivanovo - the "city of brides"
Russian writers and politicians commonly use the expression "градообразующее предприятие" (gradoobrazuyushcheye predpriyatiye, literally 'the enterprise that has created the town') to refer to the industrial facility - these days often part of a larger company such as LUKOIL or Norilsk Nickel - that is the city's main employer and the main source of funding for the city's budget.

Slovakia 
 Partizánske (formerly Baťovany), founded by Jan Antonín Baťa of the Bata Shoes company (partly out of an existing local municipality and its cadastre)
 Svit, founded by Jan Antonín Baťa of the Bata Shoes company

United Kingdom

North America

Canada 
See List of company towns in Canada

Dominican Republic 

 La Romana, primarily owned by the Central Romana Corporation (part of the Fanjul sugar and real estate empire).

Mexico 

 Ciudad Pemex, Tabasco built around a PEMEX plant.

United States 

See List of company towns in the United States

Asia

India 
Vikroli, Mumbai, earlier Bombay, developed by Godrej & Boyce Manufacturing Co. Ltd.
Sakharwadi, Maharashtra, developed by Walchand Industries
Kirloskarwadi, Maharashtra developed by L.K.Kirloskar

 Kumarapatnam, Karnataka, developed by Grasim Industries, Aditya Birla Group. A small town developed solely due to two large scale units of Grasim Industries (textiles).
 Nagda, Madhya Pradesh, developed by Grasim Industries, Aditya Birla Group. The town economy is mostly dependent on the 4 large scale units of Grasim Industries (textiles).
 Kansbahal, Orissa, developed by Larsen & Toubro Ltd. with the residential colonies, schools, hospital etc. all being established and maintained by L&T's heavy engineering works.
 Jamshedpur, Jharkhand, developed by Tata Group.
 Kailasapuram, Tiruchirapalli, Tamil Nadu developed by Bharat Heavy Electricals Limited. with the residential colonies, schools, hospital, Stadium, open air theaters etc. all being established and maintained by Bharat Heavy Electricals Limited.

Indonesia 

 Tembagapura, Papua developed by PT Freeport Indonesia (subsidiary of Freeport-McMoRan)

Japan 
Hokkaido
 Muroran, Hokkaido	Nippon Steel & Sumitomo Metal Corporation Muroran
 Tomakomai, Hokkaido - Oji Paper Company Tomakomai
 Asahikawa, Hokkaido - Nippon Paper Industries Co., Ltd. Asahikawa

Tohoku district
 Nikaho, Akita - TDK
 Aizuwakamatsu, Fukushima - Fujitsu Tohoku

Kanto district
 Hitachi, Ibaraki and Hitachinaka, Ibaraki - Hitachi
 Kashima, Ibaraki - Nippon Steel & Sumitomo Metal
 Yaita, Tochigi - Sharp Corporation
 Ota, Gunma - Fuji Heavy Industries Gunma
 Oizumi, Gunma - SanyoTokyo
 Noda, Chiba - Kikkoman
 Urayasu, Chiba - The Oriental Land Company, Tokyo Disney Resort
 Kimitsu, Chiba - Nippon Steel & Sumitomo Metal Kimitsu
 Kita, Tokyo - Oji Paper Company A foundation place and a research institute exist. 
 Fuchu, Tokyo - Toshiba Fuchu
 Minamiashigara, Kanagawa and Kaisei, Kanagawa - Fujifilm
 Hino, Tokyo - Hino Motors

Chubu district
 Kurobe, Toyama - YKK
 Komatsu, Ishikawa - Komatsu Limited
 Suwa, Nagano - Epson
 Iwata, Shizuoka - Yamaha
 Toyota City, Japan - Toyota
 Kariya, Aichi - Toyota Industries, Denso, Aisin Seiki Co., Toyotoa Auto Body, Co. Ltd., and Toyota Boshoku
 Tahara, Aichi	- Toyota Tahara
 Tokoname, Aichi - INAX
 Suzuka, Mie - Honda

Kinki district
 Ikeda, Osaka - Daihatsu
 Moriguchi, Osaka and Daitō, Osaka - Sanyo
 Kadoma, Osaka - Panasonic
 Aioi, Hyōgo - IHI, Harima
 Ayabe, Kyoto - Gunze Limited

Chugoku district
 Hiezu, Tottori - Oji Paper Company Yonago
 Tamano, Okayama - Mitsui Engineering & Shipbuilding
 Fukuyama, Hiroshima - JFE Steel Corporation
 Fuchu, Hiroshima、Bofu, Yamaguchi - Mazda
 Ube, Yamaguchi - Ube Industries
 Iwakuni, Yamaguchi - Mitsui Chemicals
 Sanyo-Onoda, Yamaguchi - Taiheiyo Cement

Shikoku district
 Naruto, Tokushima - Otsuka Pharmaceutical
 Anan, Tokushima - Nichia
 Shikokuchūō, Ehime - Daio Paper Corporation - Ehime Paper Mfg. Co..
 Niihama, Ehime - Sumitomo Metal Mining Co., Ltd.

Kyushu district
 KitaKyushu, Fukuoka (Yahatahigashi-ku, Kitakyūshū) - Nippon Steel & Sumitomo Metal Corporation and Toto
 Omuta, Fukuoka - Mitsui
 Kurume, Fukuoka - Bridgestone
 Kanda, Fukuoka - Nissan Motor Company・Nissan Shatai Kyushu、Toyota Kyushu
 Tosu, Saga - Hisamitsu Pharmaceutical
 Nagasaki, Nagasaki - Mitsubishi Heavy Industries、Mitsubishi Electric
 Sasebo, Nagasaki - Sasebo Heavy Industries Co., Ltd.
 Yatsushiro, Kumamoto - Nippon Paper Industries Co., Ltd. Yashiro
 Minamata, Kumamoto - Chisso
 Nagasu, Kumamoto - Japan Marine United Corporation
 Nakatsu, Oita - Daihatsu Kyushu
 Nobeoka, Miyazaki - Asahi Kasei
 Nichinan, Miyazaki - Oji Paper Company Nichinan

Malaysia 

 Proton City, Tanjung Malim, Perak developed by Proton Holding Berhad

Pakistan
 Batapur, a residence area for labour workers in the Bata shoe factory.
 Steel Town, a residential area for employees of Pakistan Steel Mills.

Vietnam 
 VinCity by Vincom Group.

Australia 

 Cabramurra, New South Wales, built as part of the Snowy Mountains Scheme
 Jabiru, Northern Territory, built for the Ranger Uranium Mine
 Leinster, Western Australia, BHP mining town, closed community
 Moomba, South Australia, built for gas processing
 Mount Beauty, Victoria and Bogong Village, established by the State Electricity Commission of Victoria to house construction workers from the Kiewa Hydroelectric Scheme
 Nhulunbuy, Northern Territory, built for workers at the Alcan Gove Alumina Refinery and mining operation, operated by Rio Tinto
 Roxby Downs, South Australia, built for Olympic Dam mine
 Useless Loop, Western Australia, Shark Bay Resources, Solar Salt Operations
 Yallourn, Victoria, now demolished, built by the State Electricity Commission of Victoria for workers at the Yallourn Power Station

Middle East 

 Ahmadi, home of Kuwait Oil Company
 Awali, home of the Bahrain Petroleum Company

Iran
 Naft shahr, a city established for oil well drilling.
 Mahshahr, a petroleum exporting port.
 Salafchegan, an industrial city
 Alborz Industrial City

References 

 Buildings of Ireland